Ludo is a strategy board game.

Ludo may also refer to:

Film and television
 Ludo (film), a 2020 Indian Hindi-language film
 Ludo (France Télévisions), a 2009–2019 brand for youth broadcasting on France Télévisions channels
 Ludo Studio, an Australian animation studio that produced Bluey and Content

Music
 Ludo (band), an American alternative rock band
 Ludo (Ivor Cutler album), 1967
 Ludo (Ludo album), 2004
 Ludo (soundtrack), from the 2020 film

Other uses
 Ludo (given name), including a list of people and fictional characters with the name
 Ludo King, Indian video game based on the board game

See also

 Pachisi, ancient Indian board game, ancestor of Ludo
 Ludovic, a given name and surname